Thomas Franklin Field (2 October 1879 – 1 March 1963) was an Australian rules footballer who played with Carlton in the Victorian Football League (VFL).

Notes

External links 

Frank Field's profile at Blueseum

1879 births
1963 deaths
Australian rules footballers from Victoria (Australia)
Carlton Football Club players